Jessica Vale is an American documentary director, producer, editor and musician. Vale's filmography includes the multi-award-winning documentary Small Small Thing (2013), TV series Surviving Death (Netflix) and Wrong Man (Starz), and the film The Sounding (2017) among other projects. As a musician, she has released two studio albums which included two billboard charting dance singles.

Filmography

Director 
2013: Small Small Thing
2013: Al Jazeera Witness: Small Small Thing (TV)

Producer 
2013: Small Small Thing
2013: Al Jazeera Witness: Small Small Thing

Awards 
2014 Grand Jury Prize, Rated SR Film Festival
2014 Women Film Critics Circle Award
2014 Vanya Exerjian Award
2014 Special Jury Prize, Pan African Film Festival
2013 Best International Documentary, Bronze Lens Film Festival
2013 Best Documentary, Kansas International Film Festival
2013 Best Documentary, Montreal International Black Film Festival
2013 Best Documentary, Baghdad International Film Festival
2013 Best Documentary, First Glance Film Festival
2013 Special Mention, Dallas International Film Festival

Band members
 Jessica Vale - Vocals
 Ivan Evangelista - Guitar
 Matthew St. Joseph - Bass
 Randy Schrager - Drums

Discography
Brand New Disease (October 16, 2007)
Black and Blue
Lonely Life
Exit 12
Brand New Disease
No Soul
Verses from the Rooftop
Night in Sarajevo
Time Stand Still
You Don't Wanna Know
Mirror Check
Together Alone

The Sex Album (2005)
Intro
Welcome
Boy in Black
The One Over There is All Mine
Look Pretty
Sweet 16
Breather
Sarajevo
Disco Libido (Radio Mix)
Microphone
Exit
Boy in Black (Saphin Remix)
Disco Boy (Infinite Volume Remix)
Disco Libido (Clean Radio Mix)
Boy in Black (Clean)

Disco Libido Remixed EP (2006)
Disco Libido (Dave Audé Future Disco Mix)
Disco Libido (Josh Harris Remix)
Disco Boy (Infinite Volume IDM Mix)
Disco Libido (Dirty Evangelist Mix)
Disco Libido (JL Cohen Dungeon Mix)
Disco Libido (Dave Audé Future Disco Edit)
Disco Libido (Dave Audé Future Disco Dub)

Brand New Disease Remixed (2007)
Brand New Disease (Jody Den Broeder Club Mix)
Brand New Disease (Jody Den Broeder Club Edit).aif
Brand New Disease (Jody Den Broeder Club Instrumental)
Brand New Disease (McGowan & Moss EMpulsive Mix)
Brand New Disease (McGowan & Moss EMpulsive Edit)
Brand New Disease (McGowan EMpulsive Tribal Dub)
Brand New Disease (McGowan & Moss Padapella)
Brand New Disease

External links
 Small Small Thing on IMDB
 
 Explicit Records Web site

References

American artists
Musicians from Philadelphia
American rock musicians
Living people
American people of German descent
Year of birth missing (living people)